Pan Chien-hung (born August 7, 1988) is a Taiwanese weightlifter, who competes in the 69 kg category. He placed seventeenth at the 2016 Summer Olympics, also competed in the same weight category at the 2014 and 2015 World Weightlifting Championships.

Major results

References

1988 births
Living people
Taiwanese male weightlifters
Sportspeople from Kaohsiung
Weightlifters at the 2014 Asian Games
Weightlifters at the 2016 Summer Olympics
Olympic weightlifters of Taiwan
Asian Games competitors for Chinese Taipei
21st-century Taiwanese people